Live at the London Palladium may refer to:

Music
Live at the London Palladium (Judy Garland and Liza Minnelli album), 1965
Live at the London Palladium (Marvin Gaye album), 1976
Bing Crosby Live at the London Palladium, album by Bing Crosby 1976
This House Is Not for Sale – Live from the London Palladium, album by Bon Jovi
Live at the London Palladium, album by America (band)
Live at the London Palladium, album by Jane McDonald
Live at the London Palladium, album by Paul Carrack
Live at the London Palladium, video album by Engelbert Humperdinck
Fever! Live At The London Palladium, album by Peggy Lee
Live at the London Palladium, audio album by Victor Borge
Live at the London Palladium, album by Jack Jones (American singer) 1995

Comedy
Live at the London Palladium, audio comedy album by Jackie Mason
Live at the London Palladium, video by Mike Reid (comedian)
Live at the London Palladium, video by Bruce Forsyth
Live at the London Palladium, video by Joan Rivers
Live at the London Palladium, video by Jack Dee